The Syro-Malabar Catholic Church is an Eastern Catholic church based in Kerala, India. The Syro-Malabar Church is an autonomous (sui iuris) particular church in full communion with the pope and the worldwide Catholic Church, including the Latin Church and the 22 other Eastern Catholic churches, with self-governance under the Code of Canons of the Eastern Churches (CCEO). The Church is headed by the Major Archbishop of the Syro-Malabar, currently George Alencherry. The Syro-Malabar Synod of Bishops canonically convoked and presided over by the Major Archbishop constitutes the supreme authority of the Church. The Major Archiepiscopal Curia of the Church is based in Kakkanad, Kochi. Syro-Malabar is a prefix reflecting the church's use of the East Syriac Rite liturgy and origins in Malabar (modern Kerala). The name has been in usage in official Vatican documents since the nineteenth century.

The Syro-Malabar Church is primarily based in India; with 5 metropolitan archeparchies and 10 suffragan eparchies in Kerala, there are 17 eparchies in other parts of India, and 4 eparchies outside India. It is the largest of the Saint Thomas Christians communities with a population of 2.35 million in Kerala as per the 2011 Kerala state census and 4.25 million worldwide as estimated in the 2016 Annuario Pontificio. It is the third largest sui juris church in the Catholic Church communion and the second largest Eastern Catholic church after the Ukrainian Greek Catholic Church.

The church traces its origins to the evangelistic activity of Thomas the Apostle in the 1st century. The earliest recorded organised Christian presence in India dates to the 4th century, when Persian missionaries of the East Syriac Rite tradition, members of what later became the Church of the East, established themselves in modern-day Kerala and Sri Lanka. The Church of the East shared communion within the Great Church until the Council of Ephesus in the 5th century, separating primarily over differences in Christology and due to political reasons. The Syro-Malabar Church employs a variant of the East Syriac Rite, which dates back to 3rd century Edessa, Upper Mesopotamia. As such it is a part of Syriac Christianity by liturgy and heritage.

After the schism of 1552, a faction of the Church of the East came in communion with the Holy See of Rome (modern-day Chaldean Catholic Church) and the Church of the East collapsed due to internal struggles. Throughout the later half of the 16th century, the Malabar Church was under Chaldean Catholic jurisdiction. Through the Synod of Diamper of 1599, the Malabar Church was subjected directly under the authority of the Latin Catholic Padroado Archbishopric of Goa and the Jesuits. After a half-century administration under the Goa Archdiocese, dissidents held the Coonan Cross Oath in 1653 as a protest. In response, Pope Alexander VII, with the help of Carmelite missionaries, by 1662, was able to reunite the majority of the dissidents with the Catholic Church. The Syro-Malabar Church descends from the Saint Thomas Christians who first aligned with the Catholic Church at Synod of Diamper in 1599 and those who reunited with the Holy See under the leadership of Mar Palliveettil Chandy during the period between 1655 and 1663. During the 17th and 18th centuries the Archdiocese of Cranganore was under the Syro-Malabar, but it was later suppressed and integrated into the modern day Latin Archdiocese of Verapoly.

After over two centuries under the Latin Church's hegemony, in 1887, Pope Leo XIII fully separated the Syro-Malabar from the Latin Church (the Archdiocese of Verapoly remained as the jurisdiction for Latin Catholics). Leo XIII established two Apostolic Vicariates for Syro-Malabar, Thrissur and Changanassery (originally named Kottayam), and in 1896, the Vicariate of Ernakulam was erected as well, under the guidance of indigenous Syro-Malabar bishops. In 1923, the Syro-Malabar hierarchy was organized and unified with Ernakulam as the Metropolitan See and Mar Augustine Kandathil as the first head and Archbishop of the Church. The Syro-Malabar Church in effect became an autonomous sui iuris Eastern church within the Catholic communion.

The Syro-Malabar are unique among Catholics in their inculturation with traditional Hindu customs through Saint Thomas Christian heritage. Scholar and theologian Placid Podipara describes the Saint Thomas Christian community as "Hindu in culture, Christian in religion, and Oriental in worship." The Church is predominantly of the Malayali ethnic group who speak Malayalam, although there are a minority of Tamils, Telugus, and North Indians from the various eparchies outside Kerala. Following emigration of its members, eparchies have opened in other parts of India and in other countries to serve the diaspora living in the Western world. There are four eparchies outside of India, concentrated in English-speaking countries such as Australia, Canada, the United Kingdom, and United States. Saint Alphonsa is the Church's first canonized saint, followed by Saint Kuriakose Chavara, Saint Euphrasia, and Saint Mariam Thresia. It is one of the two Eastern Catholic churches in India, the other one being the Syro-Malankara Catholic Church which represents the faction of the Puthenkoor that returned to full communion with the Holy See of Rome in 1930.

History

Pre-Coonan Cross Oath

It is believed that the Saint Thomas Christians in Malabar came into contact with the Persian Church of the East in the middle of the 4th century. Saint Thomas Christians looked to Catholicos-Patriarch of the Church of the East for ecclesiastical authority. Although the bishops from the Middle East were the spiritual rulers of the Church, the general administration of the Church of Kerala was governed by the indigenous Archdeacon. The Archdeacon was the head of Saint Thomas Christians. Even when there were more than one foreign bishop, there was only one Archdeacon for the entire community.

The Church of the East Patriarch Shemon VII Ishoyahb's unpopularity led to the schism of 1552, due to the patriarchal succession being hereditary, normally from uncle to nephew. Opponents appointed the monk Shimun VIII Yohannan Sulaqa as a rival patriarch. Sulaqa's subsequent consecration by Pope Julius III (1550–55) saw a permanent split in the Church of the East; and the reunion with Catholic Church resulted in the formation of the modern-day Chaldean Catholic Church of Iraq. 

Thus, parallel to the "traditionalist" (often referred as Nestorian) Patriarchate of the East, the "Chaldean" Patriarchate in communion with Rome came into existence. Following the schism, both traditionalist and Chaldean factions began sending their bishops to Malabar. Abraham of Angamaly was one among them. He first came to India in 1556 from the traditionalist patriarchate. Deposed from his position in 1558, he was taken to Lisbon by the Portuguese, escaped at Mozambique and left for his mother church in Mesopotamia, entered into communion with the Chaldean patriarchate and Rome in 1565, received his episcopal ordination again from the Latin patriarch of Venice as arranged by the Pope Pius IV (1559–65) in Rome. Subsequently, Abraham was appointed by Pope as Archbishop of Angamaly, with letters to the Archbishop of Goa and the Bishop of Cochin.

In 1597, Abraham of Angamaly died. The Catholic Portuguese padroado Archbishop of Goa, Aleixo de Menezes, downgraded the Angamaly Archdiocese into a suffragan diocese of the Archdiocese of Goa  and appointed the Jesuit Francisco Ros as Bishop of Angamaly. Menezes held the Synod of Diamper in 1599 to bring the Saint Thomas Christians under the complete authority of the Latin Church.

Coonan Cross Oath

The oppressive rule of the Portuguese padroado eventually led to a revolt in 1653, known as the Coonan Cross Oath. The Thomas Christians including their native priests assembled in the church of Our Lady at Mattancherry near Cochin, formally stood before a crucifix and lighted candles and solemnly swore an oath upon the Gospel that they never again accept another European prelate. The exact wording used in Coonan Cross Oath is disputed. There are various versions about the wording of oath, one version being that the oath was directed against the Portuguese, another that it was directed against Jesuits, yet another version that it was directed against the authority of Latin Catholics.

Post-Coonan Cross Oath
After the Coonan Cross Oath, the leaders of Saint Thomas Christians assembled at Edappally, where four senior priests Anjilimoottil Itty Thommen Kathanar of Kallisseri, Palliveettil Chandy Kathanar of Kuravilangad, Kadavil Chandy Kathanar of Kaduthuruthy and Vengoor Geevarghese Kathanar of Angamaly were appointed as advisors of the Archdeacon and on 22 May 1653 Archdeacon Thoma was proclaimed as bishop by the laying on of hands of twelve priests. After the consecration of Thoma I, The information about this consecration was then communicated to all the churches. The vast majority of churches accepted Thoma I as their bishop. 

At this point of time, Portuguese authorities requested direct intervention of Rome and hence Pope sent Carmelite Missionaries in two groups from the Propagation of the Faith to Malabar headed by Fr. Sebastiani and Fr. Hyacinth. Fr. Sebastiani arrived first in 1655 and began to speak directly with the Thoma I. Fr. Sebastiani, with the help of Portuguese, gained the support of many, especially with the support of Palliveettil Chandy, Kadavil Chandy Kathanar and Vengoor Geevarghese Kathanar. These were the three of the four counselors of Thoma I, who had defected with Francisco Garcia Mendes, Archbishop of Cranganore, before the arrival of Sebastaini, according to Jesuit reports.

The Carmelite missionaries succeeded in convincing a group of St.Thomas Christians that the consecration of Archdeacon as bishop was not legitimate and Thoma I started losing his followers. In the meantime, Sebastiani returned to Rome and was ordained as bishop by Pope on 15 December 1659. Between 1661 and 1662, out of the 116 churches, the Carmelites claimed eighty-four churches, leaving the native archdeacon Thoma I with thirty-two churches. The eighty-four churches and their congregations were the body from which the Syro-Malabar Catholic Church has descended.

The other thirty-two churches and their congregations represented the nucleus from which the Jacobite Syrian Christian Church (Malankara Syriac Orthodox Church), the Malankara Orthodox Syrian Church, the Malabar Independent Syrian Church, the Marthoma Syrian Church, and the Syro-Malankara Catholic Church have originated. In 1663, with the conquest of Cochin by the Dutch, the control of the Portuguese on the Malabar coast was lost. The Dutch declared that all the Portuguese missionaries had to leave Kerala. Before leaving Kerala, on 1 February 1663 Sebastiani consecrated Palliveettil Chandy as the Metran of the Thomas Christians who adhered to the Church of Rome.

Thoma I, meanwhile sent requests to various Oriental Churches to receive canonical consecration as bishop. In 1665 Gregorios Abdal Jaleel, a bishop sent by the Syriac Orthodox Patriarch of Antioch, arrived in India. The independent group under the leadership of Thoma I which resisted the authority of the Portuguese padroado welcomed him. Abdal Jaleel consecrated Thoma I canonically as a bishop and regularised his episcopal succession. This led to the first lasting formal schism in the Saint Thomas Christian community.

Thereafter, the faction affiliated with the Catholic Church under Bishop Palliveettil Chandy came to be known as Pazhayakuttukar (or "Old Allegiance"), and the branch affiliated with Thoma I came to be known as Puthenkūttukār (or "New Allegiance"). They were also known as Jacobite Syrians and they organized themselves as independent Malankara Church. The visits of prelates from the Syriac Orthodox Church of Antioch continued since then and this led to gradual replacement of the East Syriac Rite liturgy with the West Syriac Rite and the Puthenkūttukār affiliated to the Miaphysite Christology of the Oriental Orthodox Communion.

The Pazhayakuttukar faction continued with the Catholic Communion and preserved the traditional East Syriac (Persian) liturgy and Dyophysite Christology. They were also known as Romo-Syrians or Syrian Catholics.  They also used the title Malankara Church initially.  Following the death of Palliveettil Chandy in 1687, the Syrian Catholics of the Malabar coast came under the parallel double jurisdiction of Vicariate Apostolic of Malabar under Roman Catholic Carmelites and Archdiocese of Cranganore under the Padroado. Thus many priests and laymen attempted to persuade the Pope to restore their Chaldean Catholic rite and hierarchy of the local church, and for the appointment of bishops from local priests. To represent their position, Kerala's Syrian Catholics Joseph Kariattil and Paremmakkal Thomma Kathanar went to Rome in 1778. While they were in Europe, Kariatty Joseph Kathanar was installed in Portugal as the Archbishop of Kodungalloor Archdiocese. 

While journeying home, they stayed in Goa where Kariattil died before he could formally take charge. Before he died, Kariattil appointed Kathanar as the Administrator of Kodungalloor Archdiocese after him. The new administrator ran the affairs of the church, establishing his headquarters at Angamaly. In 1790, the headquarters of the Archdiocese was shifted to Vadayar, dodging the invasion of Tippu Sultan. In the last four years of his life, Thomma Kathanar managed church administration from his own parish, Ramapuram.

Angamaly Padiyola, a declaration of the Pazhayakūr gave the history of Saint Thomas Christians up to 1787 and advocated for the appointment of a native bishop that adhered to the local traditions.

Latin Catholic Carmelite clergy from Europe served as bishops, and the Church along with the Latin Catholics was under the Apostolic Vicariate of Malabar (modern-day Roman Catholic Archdiocese of Verapoly).  In 1887, the Holy See established two Apostolic Vicariates, Thrissur and Kottayam (later Changanassery) under the guidance of indigenous Syro-Malabar bishops, and named the Church as "The Syro-Malabar Church" to distinguish them from the Latins. The Holy See re-organized the Apostolic Vicariates in 1896 into three Apostolic Vicariates (Thrissur, Ernakulam, and Changanassery). A fourth Apostolic Vicariate (Kottayam) was established in 1911 for Knanaya Catholics.

Restoration of the Syro-Malabar hierarchy

In 1923, Pope Pius XI (1922–39) set up a full-fledged Syro-Malabar hierarchy with Ernakulam-Angamaly as the Metropolitan See and Augustine Kandathil as the first Head and Archbishop of the Church. In 1992, Pope John Paul II (1978–05) raised the Syro-Malabar Church to Major Archepiscopal rank and appointed Cardinal Antony Padiyara of Ernakulam as the first Major Archbishop. 

The Syro-Malabar Church shares the same liturgy with the Chaldean Catholic Church based in Iraq and the independent Assyrian Church of the East based in Iraq, including its archdiocese the Chaldean Syrian Church of India. The Syro-Malabar Church is the third-largest particular church (sui juris) in the Catholic Church, after the Latin Church and the Ukrainian Greek Catholic Church.

The Catholic Saint Thomas Christians (Pazhayakūttukār) came to be known as the Syro Malabar Catholics from 1932 onwards to differentiate them from the Syro-Malankara Catholics in Kerala. The Indian East Syriac Catholic hierarchy was restored on 21 December 1923 with Augustine Kandathil as the first Metropolitan and Head of the Church with the name Syro-Malabar.

Faith and communion of Syro-Malabarians

The Saint Thomas Christians received their bishops from the Church of the East/Chaldean Church until the end of the sixteenth century, when it was stopped by the Portuguese Latin authorities in 1597, after the death of Metropolitan Archbishop Abraham of Angamaly.

Liturgy

As per the East Syriac tradition, liturgical day of the Syro-Malabar Church starts at sunset (6 pm). Also the worshiper has to face the East while worshiping. This is not followed after Latinization.

According to the East Syriac (Edessan or Persian) tradition, the following are the seven times of prayer:

 Ramsha or the Evening Liturgy (6 pm)
 Suba-a or the Supper Liturgy (9 pm)
 Lelya or the Night Liturgy (12 am)
 Qala d-Shahra or the Vigil Liturgy (3 am)
 Sapra or the Morning Liturgy (6 am)
 Quta'a or the Third Hour Liturgy (9 am)
 Endana or the Noon Liturgy (12 pm)

The Holy Mass, which is called Holy Qurbana in East Syriac Aramaic and means "Eucharist", is celebrated in its solemn form on Sundays and special occasions. During the celebration of the Qurbana, priests and deacons put on elaborate vestments which are unique to the Syro-Malabar Catholic Church. The most solemn form of Holy Mass (Holy Qurbana) is Rāsa, literally which means "Mystery".

Restoration of East Syriac liturgy

East Syriac liturgy has three anaphorae: those of the Holy Apostles (Saints Mar Addai and Mar Mari), Mar Theodore Mpašqana, and Mar Nestorius. The first is the most popularly and extensively used. The second is used (except when the third is ordered) from Advent to Palm Sunday. The third was traditionally used on the Epiphany and the feasts of St. John the Baptist and of the Greek Doctors, both of which occur in Epiphany-tide on the Wednesday of the Rogation of the Ninevites, and on Maundy Thursday. The same pro-anaphoral part (Liturgy of the Word) serves for all three.

In the second half of the 20th century, there was a movement for better understanding of the liturgical rites. A restored Eucharistic liturgy, drawing on the original East Syriac sources, was approved by Pope Pius XII in 1957, and for the first time on the feast of St. Thomas on 3 July 1962 the vernacular, Malayalam, was introduced for the celebration of the Syro-Malabar Qurbana. Currently they celebrate the Divine Liturgy of Addai and Mari and the Anaphora of Theodre in mostly Malayalam, with Syriac and English influences.

Besides the Anaphora of Mar Addai and Mar Mari being used currently in Syro-Malabar liturgy, there are two more anaphorae known as Anaphora of Theodore and Anaphora of Nestorius. That the Anaphora of Theodore which was withdrawn from use after the Synod of Diamper (a large number of churches used it up to 1896) is being used again in the Syro-Malabar Church after 415 years is indeed an important historical reality. In a way the Syro-Malabar church rejected the Synod of Diamper. Pope Pius XII during the process of restoration of the Syro-Malabar Qurbana in 1957 had requested the restoration of the Anaphorae of Theodore and Nestorius.

The draft of the Anaphora of Theodore was restored after meticulous study by the Central Liturgical Committee, Liturgical Research Centre, various sub-committees, and the eparchial liturgical commissions. Many changes befitting to the times have been made in the prayers, maintaining maximum fidelity to the original text of the Second Anaphora. It was this text so prepared that was sent to Rome for the recognition of the Apostolic See in accordance with the decision of the Syro-Malabar Synod. The Congregation for the Eastern Churches gave its approval for using this anaphora on an experimental basis for three years on 15 December 2012.

After almost 420 years, the Anaphora of Nestorius is restored in the Syro-Malabar Church. The aftermath of the so-called Synod of Diamper was that any texts related to Nestorius were systematically burnt by the Jesuits, who represented and ruled the Latin Church of India in 1599. In a way, the SyroMalabar church rejected the Synod of Diamber (Udayamperoor) by restoring the Anaphora of Theodore and Anaphora of Nestorius.

Liturgical latinisation was furthered in 1896 by Ladislaus Zaleski, the Apostolic Delegate to India, who requested permission to translate the Roman Pontifical into Syriac. This was the choice of some Malabar prelates, who chose it over the East Syriac Rite and West Syriac Rite pontificals. A large number of Syro-Malabarians had schismed and joined with Assyrians at that time and various delayed the approval of this translation, until in 1934 Pope Pius XI stated that latinization was to no longer be encouraged. He initiated a process of liturgical reform that sought to restore the oriental nature of the Latinized Syro-Malabar rite. A restored Eucharistic liturgy, drawing on the original East Syriac sources, was approved by Pius XII in 1957 and introduced in 1962.

The church uses one of several Bible translations into Malayalam.

Liturgical calendar

The Syro-Malabar Church has its own liturgical year, structured around eight liturgical seasons:

 Suvara (Annunciation)
 Denha (Epiphany)
 Sawma Rabba (Great Lent)
 Qyamta (Resurrection of the Lord)
 Slīhe (Season of Apostles)
 Qaita  (Summer)
 Elijah-Cross-Moses (Elijah-Sliba-Muse)
 Dedication of the Church (Qudas-Edta)

Syro-Malabar hierarchy

List of ecclesiastical Heads

 Palliveettil Mar Chandy (AD 1663)
 Kariattil Mar Iousep (AD 1783)
 Mar Augustine Kandathil (AD 1923)
 Mar Antony Padiyara (1992–1997)
 Mar Varkey Vithayathil (1997–2011)
 Mar George Alencherry (2011–present)

Syro-Malabar major archiepiscopal curia

The curia of the Syro-Malabar Church began to function in March 1993 at the archbishop's house of Ernakulam-Angamaly. In May 1995, it was shifted to new premises at Mount St. Thomas near Kakkanad, Kochi. The newly constructed curial building was opened in July 1998.

The administration of the Syro-Malabar Church has executive and judicial roles. The major archbishop, officials, various commissions, committees, and the permanent synod form the executive part. The permanent synod and other offices are formed in accordance with the Code of Canons of the Eastern Churches (CCEO). The officials include the chancellor, vice-chancellor, and other officers. Various commissions are appointed by the major archbishop: Liturgy, Pastoral Care of the Migrant and Evangelisation, Particular Law, Catechism, Ecumenism, Catholic Doctrine, Clergy and Institutes of Consecrated Life, and Societies of Apostolic Life.

The members of the commissions are ordinarily bishops, but include priests. For judicial activities there is the major archiepiscopal ordinary tribunal formed in accordance with CCEO which has a statutes and sufficient personnel, with a president as its head. At present, Rev. Dr. Jose Chiramel is the president. The Major archiepiscopal curia functions in the curial building in Kerala, India. They have prepared the particular law for their Church and promulgated it part by part in Synodal News, the official Bulletin of this Church. There are statutes for the permanent synod and for the superior and ordinary tribunals. CCEO c. 122 § 2 is specific in the particular law, that the term of the office shall be five years and the same person shall not be appointed for more than two terms consecutively.

Provinces, (Arch)Eparchies and other jurisdictions

There are 35 eparchies (dioceses). Five of them are Archeparchies (of major archbishop) at present, all in southern India: Ernakulam-Angamaly, Changanacherry, Trichur, Tellicherry, and Kottayam.

These have another 13 suffragan eparchies: Bhadravathi, Belthangady, Irinjalakuda, Kanjirapally, Kothamangalam, Idukki, Mananthavady, Mandya, Palai, Palghat, Ramanathapuram, Thamarassery, and Thuckalay within the canonical territory of the Major Archiepiscopal Church.

There are 13 further eparchies outside the canonical territory of which Adilabad, Bijnor, Chanda, Gorakhpur, Jagdalpur, Kalyan, Rajkot, Sagar, Satna, Faridabad, Hosur, Shamsabad, and Ujjain in India are with exclusive jurisdiction. The St. Thomas Eparchy of Chicago in the United States, St. Thomas the Apostle Eparchy of Melbourne in Australia, Eparchy of Great Britain, and Eparchy of Mississauga, Canada enjoy personal jurisdiction.

Proper Ecclesiastical provinces
Most believers of this church are organized under five metropolitan archeparchies (archdioceses), all in Kerala, and their suffragan eparchies.

 Major Archeparchy of Ernakulam-Angamaly
Eparchy of Idukki
Eparchy of Kothamangalam
 Metropolitan Archeparchy of Changanassery
Eparchy of Kanjirappally
Eparchy of Palai
Eparchy of Thuckalay
 Metropolitan Archeparchy of Kottayam (Exclusively for the Knanaya Catholic faithful)
 Metropolitan Archeparchy of Tellicherry
Eparchy of Belthangady
Eparchy of Bhadravathi
Eparchy of Mananthavady
Eparchy of Mandya
Eparchy of Thamarassery
 Metropolitan Archeparchy of Thrissur
Eparchy of Irinjalakuda
Eparchy of Palghat
Eparchy of Ramanathapuram

Eparchies beyond Kerala with exclusive jurisdictions

 Eparchy of Bijnor
 Eparchy of Gorakhpur
 Eparchy of Sagar
 Eparchy of Satna
 Eparchy of Ujjain
 Eparchy of Rajkot
 Eparchy of Adilabad
 Eparchy of Chanda
 Eparchy of Jagdalpur

Exempt jurisdictions
 Eparchy of Kalyan, serves Mumbai and western Maharashtra
 Eparchy of Faridabad, near Delhi, also serves Haryana, (Indian) Punjab, Himachal Pradesh, Jammu and Kashmir and parts of Uttar Pradesh
 Eparchy of Hosur, in Tamil Nadu, established October 2017
 Eparchy of Shamshabad, includes the entire country of India not included in existing eparchies, established October 2017

Outside India 
 Eparchy of Mississauga, for Canada
 Eparchy of Melbourne, for Australia and New Zealand
 Eparchy of Chicago, for the USA
 Eparchy of Great Britain in Preston, England for England, Wales & Scotland

Syro-Malabar Religious Congregations

The Religious Congregations are divided in the Eastern Catholic Church Law (Code of Canons of the Oriental Churches – CCEO) as Monasteries, Hermitages, Orders, Congregations, Societies of Common Life in the Manner of Religious, Secular Institutes, and Societies of Apostolic Life.

Active are:
 Carmelites of Mary Immaculate
 Congregation of the Mother of Carmel
 Little Flower Congregation
 Franciscan Clarist Congregation
 Missionary Congregation of the Blessed Sacrament
 Missionary Society of Saint Thomas the Apostle
 Sisters of the Adoration of the Blessed Sacrament (Adoration Congregation)
 Sisters of the Destitute (S.D.)
 Vincentian Congregation
 Nazareth Sisters

Syro-Malabar  Basilicas
 Basilica of St. Mary, Champakulam, Archdiocese of Changanacherry
 St. Mary's Syro-Malabar Cathedral Basilica, Ernakulam, Archdiocese of Eranakulam-Angamaly
St. George Syro-Malabar Basilica, Angamaly, Archdiocese of Eranakulam-Angamaly
Basilica of Our Lady of Dolours, Thrissur, Archdiocese of Thrissur

Syro-Malabar Major Archiepiscopal churches
 St. Mary's Syro-Malabar Archdeacon Church Kuravilangad, Eparchy of Palai
 St. Mary's Knanaya Forane Church, Kaduthuruthy (Valiya palli), Kottayam Archdiocese
 Holy Cross Forane Church Nadavayal, Eparchy of Manathavady 
 St. Mary's Forane Church Kudamaloor, Archeparchy of Changanassery
 St. Thomas Syro-Malabar Church Palayoor, Archeparchy of Thrissur
 St. Sebastian Church Thazhekad, Eparchy of Irinjalakuda 
 St. Mary's Church (Akkarappally) Kanjirappally, Eparchy of Kanjirappally
St. Mary's Forane Church (Arakuzhapalli) Arakuzha, Moovatupuzha, Syro malabar eparchy of Kothamagalm

Statistics

According to the 2016 Annuario Pontificio pontifical yearbook, there were about 4,189,349 members in the Syro-Malabar Church.

List of prominent Syro-Malabar Catholics

Prominent Syro-Malabar leaders

 Kadavil Chandy, Syriacist, poet, and church leader.
 Joseph Kariattil – the first Indian native Metropolitan Archbishop
 Paremmakkal Thoma Kathanar, administrator of the Archdiocese of Cranganore-Angamaly and author of Varthamanappusthakam, the first travelogue in an Indian language.
 Thachil Matthoo Tharakan, a prominent lay leader and Minister of Travancore
 Nidhiry Mani Kathanar, founder of Deepika, the first Malayalam daily.
 Kudakkachira Anthoni Kathanar, 19th-century proponent of Syro-Malabar identity and traditions
 Palackal Thoma, scholar and founder of C.M.I.
 Placid J. Podipara, prominent Saint Thomas Christian historian
 Joseph Powathil, Archbishop of Changanacherry and proponent of Syro-Malabar identity and traditions
Emmanuel Thelly, orientalist and Syriacist, author of several books including a Syriac lexicon
 Koonammakkal Thomas, expert in Syro-Malabar history and Suriyani Malayalam

Saints, Blesseds, Venerables and Servants of God

Saints
Alphonsa of the Immaculate Conception – religious sister of FCC congregation
Kuriakose Elias Chavara – priest and one of the founding members of CMI
Euphrasia Eluvathingal – religious sister of CMC congregation
Mariam Thresia Chiramel– religious sister and founder of Holy Family congregation

Beatified people
Augustine Thevarparambil (Kunjachan) – priest
Rani Maria (1954–1995) – religious sister of FCC congregation

Venerables
Payyappilly Varghese Kathanar – priest and founder of Sisters of the Destitute (1876–1929)
Thomas Kurialachery – first bishop of Archeparchy of Changanassery (1872–1925)
Kadalikkattil Mathai Kathanar – priest (1872–1935)
Joseph Vithayathil – priest and co-founder of Holy Family congregation (1865–1964)
Augustine John Ukken – priest and Congregation of Sisters of Charity (CSC) (1880–1956)

Servants of God

Tommiyachan Poothathil, (1871–1943)
Mary Celine Payyappilly (1906–1993)
Joseph C. Panjikaran (1888–1949)
Antony Thachuparambil (1894–1963)
Mathew Kavukattu (1904–1969)
Maria Celine Kannanaikal (1931–1957)
Thommachen Puthenparampil
 Canisius Thekkekara (1914–1998)
Mary Francesca de Chantal (1880–1972)
Varkey Kattarath
Joseph Kandathil

Candidates for canonization

 Fr. Emilian Vettath CMI

See also
 Liturgical calendar of the Syro-Malabar Catholic Church
 Sisters of the Destitute
 Carmelites of Mary Immaculate
 Congregation of Saint Thérèse of Lisieux
 All India Catholic Union
 Catholic Church in India

Notes

References

References and bibliography

 ASSEMANI, Bibliotheca Orientalis (Rome, 1719–28); DE SOUZA.
 Orientale Conquistado (2 vols., Indian reprint, Examiner Press, Bombay).
 .
 Fr. tr. De Glen, Histoire Orientale etc. (Brussels, 1609); DU JARRIC.
 .
 
 
 
 (Postscript)(PDF).
 Menachery G (1973) The St. Thomas Christian Encyclopedia of India , Ed. George Menachery, B.N.K. Press, vol. 2, Lib. Cong. Cat. Card. No. 73-905568; B.N.K. Press  – (has some 70 lengthy articles by different experts on the origins, development, history, culture ... of these Christians, with some 300 odd photographs). Vol. 1, 1982. Vol. 3, 2010.
 Mundadan, A. Mathias. (1984) History of Christianity in India, vol. 1, Bangalore, India: Church History Association of India.
 Podipara, Placid J. (1970) "The Thomas Christians". London: Darton, Longman and Tidd, 1970. (is a readable and exhaustive study of the St. Thomas Christians.)
 Philip, E. M. (1908) The Indian Christians of St. Thomas (1908; Changanassery: Mor Adai Study Center, 2002).
 Aprem, Mar. (1977) The Chaldaean Syrian Church in India. Trichur, Kerala, India: Mar Narsai, 1977.
 Menachery, George (2000) Kodungallur – The Cradle of Christianity in India, Thrissur: Marthoma Pontifical Shrine.
 Menachery, George & Snaitang, Dr. Oberland (2012)"India's Christian Heritage". The Church History Association of India, Dharmaram College, Bangalore.
 Acts of St. Thomas (Syriac) MA. Bevan, London, 1897
 
 Michael Geddes, (1694) A Short History of the Church of Malabar together with the Synod of Diamper, London. Ed. Prof. George Menachery in the Nazranies i.e. The Indian Church History Classics I, 1998.
 Puthur, B. (ed.) (2002):  The Life and Nature of the St Thomas Christian Church in the Pre-Diamper Period (Cochi, Kerala).
 T.K Velu Pillai, (1940) "The Travancore State Manual"; 4 volumes; Trivandrum
 Menachery G (ed); (1998) "The Indian Church History Classics", Vol. I, The Nazranies, Ollur, 1998. .
 Menachery, George. Glimpses of Nazraney Heritage.SARAS 2005 Ollur.
 Palackal, Joseph J. Syriac Chant Traditions in South India. PhD, Ethnomusicology, City University of New York, 2005.
 Joseph, T. K. The Malabar Christians and Their Ancient Documents. Trivandrum, India, 1929.
 Leslie Brown, (1956) The Indian Christians of St. Thomas. An Account of the Ancient Syrian Church of Malabar, Cambridge: Cambridge University Press 1956, 1982 (repr.)
 Thomas P. J; (1932) "Roman Trade Centres in Malabar", Kerala Society Papers II.
 Marco Polo.(1298) LATHAM, R. (TRANSL.) "The Travels" Penguin Classics 1958
 Bjorn Landstrom (1964) "The Quest for India", Doubleday (publisher) English Edition, Stockholm.
 Francis Eluvathingal (ed), Syro-Malabar Church Since the Eastern Code, Mary Matha Publications, Trichur, 2003.
 Francis Eluvathingal, "Patriarchal and Major Archiepiscopal Curia in the Eastern Catholic Legilations based on CCEO Canons 114–125" ORISI, Kottayam, 2009.

External links

Syro-Malabar Church
Archdiocese of Thrissur
Archdiocese of Kottayam
Archdiocese of Changanacherry
Archdiocese of Ernakulam-Angamaly
Archdiocese of Tellicherry
The website for Synod of Diamper
Indian Christianity : Books by Geddes, Mackenzie, Medlycott, &c.
The Chennai Mission 
Syro malabar mission in Chennai 
Syro Malabar Church in Australia
Nazraney Heritage
Syro Malabar Church in Qatar
www.christianhomily.com Sunday and Feast Homily Resources in English and Homily Videos in Malayalam according to the Syro-Malabar Calendar Set one and two by Fr. Abraham Mutholath
Homily Videos in Malayalam by Fr. Abraham Mutholath
www.bibleinterpretation.org Bible Interpretation by Rev. Abraham Mutholath in English.
www.biblereflection.org Bible Interpretation with reflection by Rev. Abraham Mutholath in English.

Syro Malabar Matrimony
Article on the Syro-Malabar Catholic Church by Ronald Roberson on the CNEWA web site
Fathima Matha Church, East Hill, Kozhikode

 
1st-century establishments in India
Churches in India